Sir Clarence Henry Kennett Marten  (28 October 1872 – 11 December 1948) was the Provost of Eton and the private tutor of Queen Elizabeth II.

Biography
Henry Marten was born with his twin sister Isabel in Kensington, London. He was the younger son of Sir Alfred Marten and his wife Patricia and was the brother of Sir Alfred Barrington Marten, Chief Justice of the Bombay High Court from 1926-30. Marten entered Eton College, and from there matriculated at Balliol College, Oxford in 1891. In 1895, he graduated with a first-class degree in modern history and accepted an offer from Edmond Warre to return to Eton to teach history.

He was a founder member of the Historical Association in 1906. In 1912, he published The Groundwork of British History with his co-author, George Townsend Warner, which became "one of the most used school textbooks of the first half of the twentieth century". With E. H. Carter, he wrote a school textbook for younger children, in several volumes, titled simply "Histories". Other collaborative works included The Teaching of History in 1938.

In 1925, Marten narrowly missed becoming Master of Magdalene College, in Cambridge, when he was recommended to the Hereditary Visitor of Magdalene, Lord Braybrooke as a possible candidate, but the College Fellows opposed the appointment, preferring another candidate, A. S. Ramsey. Braybrooke chose to appoint neither, and instead A. B. Ramsay, who was Lower Master at Eton, got the job. Marten was appointed to Ramsay's vacated post at Eton. Further promotions followed, to Vice-Provost in 1929, and Provost in 1945.
 
In 1938, Marten began instructing Princess Elizabeth (later Queen Elizabeth II) in constitutional history. He was appointed Knight Commander of the Royal Victorian Order in the 1945 New Year Honours, and received the accolade from King George VI on 4 March 1945, on the steps of Eton College Chapel.

He died unmarried in the Provost's Lodge at Eton, where the Marten Library is named after him. The library contains his collection of books, which he bequeathed to Eton on his death.

Notes

References

External links
 British Pathé News film of Henry Marten being knighted on the steps of Eton College Chapel

1872 births
1948 deaths
Alumni of Balliol College, Oxford
Knights Commander of the Royal Victorian Order
Provosts of Eton College
English historians
19th-century English educators
People educated at Eton College